Land of the Leopard National Park is a national park in Primorsky Krai in the Russian Far East, covering an area of  west of Razdolnaya River. It was gazetted in April 2012. It was established to protect the Amur leopard which was at the time the world's rarest cat with an estimated population of 30 individuals. The park was created from the merger of Kedrovaya Pad Nature Reserve, Barsovy Federal Wildlife Refuge and Borisovkoye Plateau Regional Wildlife Refuge, and a new territory along the border with China.

History 

By the beginning of the 21st century the Amur leopard population was on the verge of extinction. As a result of poaching and fires, the vast habitat of the beast had shrunk to a narrow stripe in the southwest of Primorsky Krai. By then, a Kedrovaya Pad nature reserve and several breeding grounds existed here, but only expansion of the protected area and integrated management of the existing natural territories could solve the problem of conserving the rare cat.

The Land of the Leopard National Park was founded on April 5, 2012, thanks to the efforts of ecologists and personal attention to the problem of Sergey Ivanov, the former Director of the Executive Office of the President of the Russian Federation. Its territory in the area of 262 th. ha has covered the most part of the rare predator’s habitat including the land of Khasansky and Nadezhdinsky Districts of Primorye, the Ussuriysky Urban District, as well as a little part of Vladivostok city.

Ecoregion and climate
Land of the Leopard is in the Manchurian mixed forests ecoregion.  The climate is humid continental climate, warm summer subtype (Köppen climate classification . This climate is characterized by mild summers (only 1–3 months above ) and cold winters having monthly precipitation less than one-tenth of the wettest summer month.

Biodiversity
Land of the Leopard National Park has been established for the protection of the Amur leopard. Siberian tiger, Eurasian lynx, and 54 mammal species live in the park. The black vulture is among the 184 bird species recorded. As of 2017, the Amur Leopard population in the park has reportedly risen to 84 adults and 14 kittens.

Activities 

The National Park is facing an extraordinary task, that is, protection and conservation of the only wild Amur leopard population in the world. That is why a persistent battle against poaching and fires has been fought here, the hoofed animals are being fed; ecological monitoring and community outreach are being carried out. Those measures have resulted in a considerable increase in the number of the spotted cats and a tendency for further growth. The main task of scientific research conducted by Land of the Leopard is study and long-time monitoring of Amur leopard and Siberian tiger populations for preserving and restoring their numbers. Photomonitoring, winter route census based on traces in snow, as well as collection and analysis of scat help the scientists to determine the number of leopards and tigers, to study their diets, to reveal possible diseases and peculiarity of their behaviour. At present, camera traps are used to monitor wildlife. The largest net of camera traps consisting of more than 400 units in an area of 362000 ha. After sorting hundreds of thousands of shots, the scientists identify each leopard and tiger according to a unique pattern of spots and stripes on their fur.

Tourism 
Ecotourism is one of the best ways to touch the unique nature of the southwest of Primorsky Krai and learn all about the Amur leopard. The gateway of the national park for visitors is the visit center “Land of the Leopard” located in the village of Barabash. There is also an opportunity to see and photograph wildlife from behind blinds.

References

National parks of Russia
Geography of Primorsky Krai
Protected areas of the Russian Far East
Protected areas established in 2012
2012 establishments in Russia